The BFF U-16 Football Tournament is a youth football competition of the Bangladeshi football league system for youth players under 16 years old where youth teams of Bangladesh Championship League teams compete in. Founded in 2022, it is administered by the Bangladesh Football Federation (BFF).

History
On 20 September 2022, the Bangladesh Football Federation (BFF) decided to launch the BFF U-16 Football Tournament for the U-16 players of clubs participating in Bangladeshi football's second-tier, the Bangladesh Championship League (BCL). The tournament was founded alongside the BFF U-18 Football League for Bangladesh Premier League clubs, however, due to the lack of finance available to the BCL teams the competition would be held in a tournament format instead of a league.

Format
As per 2021–22 season, all the participant teams will be divided into two groups. Every team will play once against the other teams of their group in group phase. The champion and runners-up of both groups will qualify for semi-final.

Current Teams
.

Cup winners and finalists

Statistics by club

Top goalscorers by edition

Awards

Player of the Tournament

Sponsorship

Media coverage 
28 matches of season 2021–2022 were broadcast live at Bangladesh Football Federation on Facebook and YouTube.

See also

 BFF U-18 Football League

References

Football cup competitions in Bangladesh
Sports leagues established in 2022
Youth football in Bangladesh
Football leagues in Bangladesh